Irene Sciriha Aquilina is a Maltese mathematician specializing in spectral graph theory and chemical graph theory. A particular topic of her research has been the singular graphs, graphs whose adjacency matrix is a singular matrix, and the nut graphs, singular graphs all of whose nontrivial induced subgraphs are non-singular. She is a professor of mathematics at the University of Malta.

Education and career
Sciriha studied mathematics at the University of Malta, earning bachelor's and master's degrees as the only woman studying mathematics or physics there at that time. She completed a Ph.D. in 1998 at the University of Reading in England. Her dissertation, On some aspects of graph spectra, was jointly supervised by Anthony Hilton and Stanley Fiorini.

She began teaching at the University of Malta in 1971. She was convenor of European Women in Mathematics from 2000 to 2001.

Recognition
Sciriha is a Fellow of the Institute of Combinatorics and its Applications. One of her students, chemist Martha Borg, won the Turner Prize at the University of Sheffield for a doctoral dissertation co-advised by Sciriha and Patrick W. Fowler.

References

External links

Home page

Year of birth missing (living people)
Living people
Maltese mathematicians
20th-century mathematicians
21st-century mathematicians
Women mathematicians
Graph theorists
Alumni of the University of Reading
Academic staff of the University of Malta